Salamatabad (also Romanized as Salāmatābād; also known as Salāmābād) is a village in Sofla Rural District, in the Central District of Kharameh County, Fars Province, Iran. At the 2006 census, its population was 560, in 138 families.

References 

Populated places in Kharameh County